The Pocilloporidae are a family of stony corals in the order Scleractinia occurring in the Pacific and Indian Oceans.

Description
Pocilloporids are colonial and most species are reef-building. They are very variable in size and shape, some being submassive and others arborescent or ramose. The corallites are small and vary from being sunken to being raised cones. The columellae are well developed and the septa may be fused with them. The coenosteum lining the skeleton is covered with spinules. The Pocilloporidae are closely related to the other coral families, Astrocoeniidae and Acroporidae.

Biology
The genera in this family are polymorphic, differing in growth form according to their habitat, but showing similar growth forms in response to light availability and wave action. The colonies are hermaphrodites. The sperm is liberated into the sea and finds its way into other polyps. After internal fertilisation, the planula larvae are brooded by the parent before being ejected into the water column. This means the dispersal distances are small, but the likelihood of finding a suitable substrate on which to settle are raised.

Genera
The World Register of Marine Species lists these genera in the family:-

 Madracis Milne Edwards & Haime, 1849
 Pocillopora Lamarck, 1816
 Seriatopora Lamarck, 1816
 Stylophora Schweigger, 1820

References

 
Taxa named by John Edward Gray
Scleractinia
Cnidarian families